Virolainen's cabinet was the 49th government of Finland. The cabinet existed from 12 October 1964 to 27 May 1966. It was a majority government whose Prime Minister was Johannes Virolainen.

Virolainen's cabinet made many political reforms. It instituted the purchase tax law, the new language law, the development area law and founded universities in the eastern and northern parts of the country. The cabinet had economical problems and had to raise both the road and fuel taxes.

Sources
 Governments and Ministers since 1917 / No. 49. Virolainen. Finnish Government.

Virolainen
1964 establishments in Finland
1966 disestablishments in Finland
Cabinets established in 1964
Cabinets disestablished in 1966